Farah Aqil (Urdu: فرح عاقل) is a Pakistani Politician and a Member of Senate of Pakistan, currently serving as Chairperson Senate Committee on Inter-Provincial Coordination.

Political career
She belongs to Awami National Party and was elected to the Senate of Pakistan on reserved seat for women. She is the chairperson of Chairperson Senate Committee on Inter-Provincial Coordination and member of Senate Committee of National Health Services, Regulations and Coordination, Science and Technology, Information, Broadcasting and National Heritage, she has previously served as MPA in KPK Assembly in 2001-2002.

See also
 List of Senators of Pakistan
 List of committees of the Senate of Pakistan

References

External links
Awami National Party Official Site

Living people
Members of the Senate of Pakistan
Awami National Party politicians
21st-century Pakistani women politicians
Year of birth missing (living people)